Waris Shah (1722–1798) was a Punjabi Sufi poet of the Chishti order, known for his contribution to Punjabi literature. He is primarily known as the author of Heer Ranjha .

Background

Syed Mohammad Waris Shah was born in Jandiala Sher Khan, Punjab, present-day Pakistan into a reputed Sayyid family and was a descendant of Sayyid Muhammad Al-Makki through his son Sayyid Badruddin. His father's name was Gulsher Shah and mother's name was Kamal Banu. Waris's parents are said to have died when he was young. Waris spent years in search of the perfect spiritual guide. Waris Shah acknowledged himself to be a disciple of an ustad from Kasur, namely Hafiz Ghulam Murtaza from whom he received his education. After completing his education, Waris moved to Malka Hans, a village twelve kilometres north of Pakpattan. Here he resided in a small room, adjacent to a historic mosque now called Masjid Waris Shah, until his death.
Other poets later added their own verses in Qissa Waris Shah throughout the history. It is estimated that there are 11069 forged  verses in the commonly available Qissa Waris Shah. One of the oldest and most accurate copy of Qissa Waris Shah published by Kripa Ram  in 1916 is available in the Punjab Public Library in Lahore.

Works

Examples 
Many verses of Waris Shah are widely used in Punjab in a moral context, for instance:

 Naa adataan jaandiyan ne, Bhavein katiye poriyan poriyan ji 

(A man never abandons his habits, even if he is hacked to pieces)
 Waris rann, faqir, talwar, ghora; Chare thok eh kisse de yar nahin (Waris says that woman, beggar, sword and horse, these four are never anyone's friends)
 Waris Shah faqir di aqal kithe;  eh pattian ishq padhiyan hun
 
 (It is beyond the wisdom of faqeer Waris Shah (to write this verse), (But) these lessons are taught by Love)
 Eh rooh qalboot da zikr sara nal aqal de mel bulaya ee (This entire reference is about Soul meeting with the Divine, Beloved which has been contrived with great wisdom)

The renowned Punjabi writer and poet Amrita Pritam is best remembered for her famous work Ajj Aakhaan Waris Shah Nu (lit: "Today I Invoke Waris Shah") about the horrors of the partition of the Punjab during the Partition of India.
 Ajj Akan Waris shah nu, k tu Qabran vichon bol
 
 (Today, I call upon Waris Shah, to rise from the grave and speak)
 Te Ajj kitaab e ishq da, koi Agla warka phol 

(And plead with him to open another page in the book of love)

Portrayal in media 
Waris Shah's life has been fictionalised in Punjabi-language films. A 1964 Pakistani film titled Waris Shah featured Inayat Hussain Bhatti in the title role. Another film on the life of Shah, Sayyed Waris Shah, was released in India in 1980; followed by Waris Shah: Ishq Daa Waaris in 2006 which had Gurdas Maan in the role of Waris Shah.

See also
 List of Punjabi language poets

References

1722 births
1798 deaths
Punjabi-language poets
People from Sheikhupura District
Sufi poets
Sufism
Mystic poets
Punjabi Sufi saints
Punjabi people
Sufism in Pakistan
Sufi shrines in Pakistan
Heer Ranjha